Jays Foods, Inc., is an American manufacturer of snack products including potato chips, popcorn and pretzels.  Jays Foods was founded in 1927 in Chicago, Illinois, and is currently a subsidiary of Snyder's of Hanover.  Operating in several Midwestern states, Jays Foods' potato chips and popcorn maintain significant shares of their respective markets.

History
Leonard Japp, Sr. began selling pretzels from a truck in 1927.  The business grew to feature a potato chip recipe made by Japp’s wife, Eugenia.  After the Wall Street Crash of 1929, Japp found a new business partner and began selling the chips under the brand name "Mrs. Japp’s Potato Chips".  The 1941 Attack on Pearl Harbor and the subsequent anti-Japanese sentiment, however, led to a negative connotation towards the word "Jap" in the United States.  The chips were consequently rebranded to "Jays Potato Chips" to avoid the sound-alike name, and the company became Jays Foods, Inc.

Jays Foods remained a family-owned company until 1986, when the company was sold to Borden, Inc.  In 1994, Jays Foods was re-acquired by the Japp Family.  In 2004, Jays Foods was purchased by Willis Stein & Partners, a Chicago private-equity firm, and, together with another snack company acquired by Willis Stein & Partners, Lincoln Snacks Company, assigned a parent company, Ubiquity Brands.

Jays Foods filed for Chapter 11 bankruptcy on October 11, 2007, the second time in four years, and permanently closed its Chicago manufacturing plant on December 5, 2007.  On December 5, 2007 the remaining assets of Jay's were acquired by Snyder's-Lance, Inc. who have said they will continue to manufacture and distribute Jays products throughout the Midwest. Snyder's-Lance will continue to operate Jays Chicago warehouse and distribution center and its Jeffersonville, Indiana manufacturing facility.

Operations
Jays Foods  manufactures, markets and distributes its products in the seven state area of Illinois, Indiana, Michigan, Wisconsin, Iowa, Minnesota and Missouri. Jays Foods has distribution centers in fifteen major cities in the seven state marketing area.  Jays has 310 company-owned routes, and 200 routes owned by independent distributors.  The company has a total of 943 employees.

Market share
Jays Foods does not market its products nationally.  Despite competition from national brands such as Frito-Lay, which has a 67 percent market share,  Jays Foods has 23 percent share of the potato chip market in Illinois, Indiana, Wisconsin, Missouri, Minnesota and Iowa and over 60 percent market share in the "ready-to-eat" popcorn category.  Jays foods has been considering the possibility of competing as a national brand and has conducted marketing research and held focus groups in New Jersey and California.

Products
Jays (potato chips)
 Jays Crispy Ridged Potato Chips – Original; Ranch Herb; Onion & Garlic; Barbecue, Cheddar & Sour Cream.  
 Jays E-Z Dippin's (discontinued) – Mini Pretzels & mustard; Tortilla Chips & Nacho Cheese Dip; Tortilla Chips & Salsa
 Jays Potato Chips – Original; Barbecue; Cheese; Salt 'n Sour; Sour 'n Dill; Hot Stuff, Jay's bacon & cheddar

Krunchers! (kettle and corn chips)
 Krunchers! Potato Chips – Original; Reduced Fat; Cheddar & Sour Cream; Jalapeño; Sea Salt & Cracked Pepper; Mesquite Bar-B-Que; Hawaiian Sweet Onion; Hot Buffalo Wing; Kosher Dill
 Krunchers! Sweet Baby Jays (discontinued) – Chips made from sweet potatoes; introduced summer 2006
 Krunchers! Corn chips – Spicy Four Cheese; Guacamole; Jalapeño

O-Ke-Doke (popcorn)
 O-Ke-Doke Balls of Fire
 O-Ke-Doke Hot Cheese Flavored Popcorn
 O-Ke-Doke Cheese Popcorn
 O-Ke-Doke Chicago Mix Popcorn (Cheese and Caramel Corn)
 O-Ke-Doke White Cheddar Popcorn

Hot Stuff (other snacks)
 Hot Stuff Crunchy Cheezlets

See also
Frito-Lay
Old Dutch Foods

Notes

Bibliography

External links
 Official website (archived, 20 Apr 2014)

Brand name potato chips and crisps
Brand name snack foods
Food and drink companies based in Chicago
Manufacturing companies based in Chicago
American companies established in 1927
Food and drink companies established in 1927
Cuisine of the Midwestern United States
Economy of the Midwestern United States
Snyder's-Lance Inc. brands
1927 establishments in Illinois